Vincas Mykolaitis, known by his pen name Putinas (literally Viburnum) (6 January 1893 in Pilotiškės, Suwałki Governorate – 7 June 1967 in Kačerginė), was a Lithuanian poet and writer. He was also a priest, but renounced his priesthood in 1935.

Biography
In 1909, Mykolaitis enrolled to the Seinai Priest Seminary, after few years he published his first poem. In 1915, he was ordained as a priest, however he questioned his mission as a priest. Later he continued studies at the Saint Petersburg Roman Catholic Theological Academy. In St. Petersburg, Mykolaitis published his first collection of poems in 1917. After St. Petersburg, Mykolaitis continued his studies at the University of Fribourg, Switzerland, and received doctoral degree in 1922.

After studies in western Europe Mykolaitis settled in Lithuania, teaching at the University of Lithuania. During his stay in France, Mykolaitis started to work on his most famous novel —  (In the Shadow of the Altars). The 3-part novel was published in 1933 and caused a scandal in Lithuania as it described a priest doubting and eventually renouncing his calling. In 1935, Mykolaitis renounced his priesthood. In 1940, he started to work at Vilnius University, there he became professor.

Other notable works of Mykolaitis were novel Sukilėliai (Rebels) (unfinished) and Tarp dviejų aušrų (Between Two Dawns).

Mykolaitis died in 1967 in Kačerginė near Kaunas and was buried in Rasos Cemetery, Vilnius.

Commemoration
There is Putinas's house museum in his birth home in the village of Pilotiškės.

In 2002, a memorial museum of Putinas was opened at Rygiškių Jonas gymnasium in Kaunas.

References

External links
 Lithuanian Classical Literature Anthology. Major works. Retrieved on 2007-09-22
 Lithuanian Classical Literature Anthology. Altorių šešėly (In the Shadows of Altar) text. Retrieved on 2007-09-22

1893 births
1967 deaths
People from Prienai District Municipality
Lithuanian writers
Lithuanian-language writers
Academic staff of Vilnius University
University of Fribourg alumni
Academic staff of Vytautas Magnus University
Soviet literary historians
Soviet male writers
20th-century male writers
20th-century Lithuanian Roman Catholic priests
Burials at Rasos Cemetery